This is a list of international organizations in which Canada has membership.

Organizations, summits, and forums 
 Agence de Coopération Culturelle et Technique
 Arctic Council
  — dialogue partner
ASEAN Regional Forum
 Asia Pacific Economic Cooperation (APEC)
 Community of Democracies
  (observer)
 Democratic 10-D10
 Diplomatic Forum
 Euro-Atlantic Partnership Council
 European Bank for Reconstruction and Development
 European Space Agency (cooperating state)
 Food and Agriculture Organization
G20
 Group of Seven (G7)
 Group of Eight (G8)
 Group of Ten (G10)

International Criminal Court
 International Hydrographic Organization
 International Indigenous Affairs 
 International Mobile Satellite Organization
 International Organization for Standardization (ISO)
 International Red Cross and Red Crescent Movement
International Federation of Red Cross and Red Crescent Societies
 International Telecommunications Satellite Organization
 Interpol
 Multilateral Organisation Performance Assessment Network (MOPAN)
 (NATO)
 Nuclear Suppliers Group
 Open Government Partnership

Organisation for Economic Co-operation and Development (OECD)
International Energy Agency
Nuclear Energy Agency
Organisation for the Prohibition of Chemical Weapons
  (OSCE)
Organisation internationale de la Francophonie (OIF or La Francophonie)
  (OAS)
Pacific Alliance
  (partner)
Paris Club
 Permanent Court of Arbitration
Southeast European Cooperative Initiative (observer)
 
World Customs Organization

Zangger Committee

Multilateral organizations 

 African Development Bank (AfDB) — non-regional member
 Asian Development Bank (ADB) — non-regional member
 Caribbean Development Bank (CDB)
 
 Consultative Group on International Agricultural Research (CGIAR)
 European Bank for Reconstruction and Development (EBRD)
 Global Alliance for Vaccines and Immunization (GAVI)
 Global Environment Facility (GEF)
 Global Fund to Fight AIDS, Tuberculosis and Malaria
 Inter-American Development Bank (IDB)
 International Fund for Agricultural Development (IFAD)
 Development Finance Institution
 International Monetary Fund (IMF)
 Red Cross and Red Crescent Movement (RCM)
 International Federation of Red Cross and Red Crescent Societies
 
 Joint United Nations Programme on HIV/AIDS (UNAIDS)
 
 United Nations Development Programme (UNDP)
 United Nations High Commissioner for Refugees (UNHCR)
 United Nations Population Fund (UNFPA)
 World Food Programme (WFP)
  (WHO)
 World Bank Group (WBG)
International Finance Corporation (IFC)
International Bank for Reconstruction and Development
 International Development Association
Multilateral Investment Guarantee Agency

United Nations 

 International Civil Aviation Organization
International Fund for Agricultural Development
 International Labour Organization
 International Maritime Organization

International Organization for Migration
International Telecommunication Union
Universal Postal Union

United Nations Conference on Trade and Development
 
 World Intellectual Property Organization
 World Meteorological Organization
 World Tourism Organization

International organizations and offices in Canada

See also

Foreign Affairs and International Trade Canada
Foreign policy of the Stephen Harper government
Foreign relations of Canada

References

Canada
Foreign relations of Canada
Government of Canada